The Spangler Candy Company is a privately owned international confectioner that has been manufacturing and marketing candy since 1906. Headquartered in Bryan, Ohio, Spangler's products include lollipops, candy canes, and marshmallow circus peanuts. Spangler brand names include Dum Dums, Saf-T-Pops, Whistle Pops, Spangler Candy Canes, and Spangler Circus Peanuts. Dum Dums were invented in 1924, and Spangler purchased the rights and equipment in 1953. The small multicolor lollipops are popular as free giveaways.  In 2018, Spangler bought various assets and brands from the defunct Necco, retaining the rights to Necco Wafers, Sweethearts conversation hearts, and Canada Mints. In 2020, Spangler bought the rights to Bit-O-Honey from Pearson Candy Company.

Spangler also sells a variety of mint candy, hard candy, dextrose candy, and caramel candy.

Spangler is the second largest employer in Bryan, Ohio. Spangler gives Bryan its identity as the "Dum Dum Capitol of the World". The company produces approximately 45% of the candy canes sold in the United States and produces over 12 million Dum Dums per day.

History

Spangler Candy Company was established August 20, 1906 when Arthur G. Spangler purchased the Gold Leaf Baking Company of Defiance, Ohio for $450 and moved it to 204 W. High Street in Bryan, Ohio. The new company was named Spangler Manufacturing Company and produced baking soda, baking powder, corn starch, laundry starch, spices, and flavorings.

In 1908, Ernest Spangler joined the company and suggested adding candy to the product line. In 1911, the Spangler Coconut Ball became the first candy manufactured by Spangler. In 1913, the business moved to its present location on N. Portland Street in Bryan, Ohio. In 1914 Omar Spangler joined the company, bringing mechanical & bookkeeping knowledge. Spangler manufactured: Creme Peanut Clusters, Coconut Balls, Bryan Drops, hand-dipped chocolates, chocolate bars, ice cream cones, soda pop, and cough drops.

Extended timeline:
1920: Truman Spangler joins the company as a salesman; company's name is changed to Spangler Candy Company.
1922: Hard candy equipment is purchased and stick candy is manufactured. One of the most successful hard candies is the penny apple sucker. The sticks are placed in by hand and the pop is sold unwrapped. Chocolate equipment is also purchased, which eliminates the need to hand dip chocolate items. A variety of 60 products are being made and shipped from Spangler Candy Company.
1927: Spangler founds wholesaling subsidiary in Maumee, Ohio.
1931: Spangler acquires Hickok Honeycomb Chocolate of Sydney, Ohio.
1940: Spangler created their Marshmallow Circus Peanuts, their version of a popular penny candy.
1941: Marshmallow Topping is introduced and becomes popular as a sugar substitute during World War II.
1945: Founder Arthur Spangler dies in boating accident.
1946: The company is reorganized from a partnership to a corporation.
1953: Dum Dum Pops are acquired from Akron Candy Co. of Bellevue, Ohio.
1954: A-Z Christmas Candy Cane Company of Detroit, Michigan, is acquired.
1957: Ohio Confections Fudge of Cleveland, makers of Pecan Divinity, is acquired.
1960: The second generation Spanglers now actively manage the company. Ted Spangler is president and sales manager. Harlan Spangler is treasurer and financial officer. Norman Spangler is secretary and production manager. Frank Spangler is in purchasing and product design. Charles Spangler is transportation manager and in sales service. Albert Spangler manages the Toledo Wholesale operation. Ernest Spangler, now 80, continues as honorary chairman. The first union contract with Toledo Local 20 of the International Brotherhood of Teamsters is signed.
1962: Shelby Bubble Gum of Shelby, Ohio, is acquired.

1965: American Mint Corp. of New York City is acquired.
1966: The Spangler Candy Dum Dums Drum Man was born in April 1966. He was developed by the Howard Swink Advertising Agency of Marion, Ohio.
1978: Saf-T-Pops is acquired from Curtiss Candy Co. of Chicago, Illinois. C. Gregory Spangler, third generation family member, becomes President.
1980: The company acquires Standard the Candy Cane Company of Detroit, Michigan.
1987: Astro Pops brand is acquired from Nellson Candy Co. of Los Angeles, California.
1990: Spangler sells its subsidiary distributorship, Spangler Candy & Tobacco of Toledo to concentrate on manufacturing candy.
1995: Suck An Egg brand is acquired from Innovative Confections of Idaho Falls, Idaho.
1996: Dean L. Spangler. third generation family member, becomes President. Spangler establishes an internet presence with a website at www.spanglercandy.com
2001: The Save Wraps for Stuff Program returns along with a new kid-focused website at www.dumdumpops.com.
2005: Spangler Candy establishes the Spangler Foundation to honor the 2nd generation; provides community funds and scholarships to local area students. The Spangler Candy Company Store & Museum opens in late December.
2006: Spangler Candy celebrates its 100th year with a gala celebration on August 19, 2006. Customers, brokers, vendors, community leaders, employees, 25-Year Club members, and shareholders participated in the event.
2007: In June, the Spangler Fulfillment Center begins operation as a distribution center for Save Wrapsfor Stuff and website items. Spangler sells its chocolate business to Key III Candies of Fort Wayne, Indiana.
2008: Kirkland B. Vashaw, fourth generation family member, becomes President.
2009: Dum Dums Facebook fan page is created in April and new Flick-A-Pop application goes live on iTunes in May.
2011: Kirk Vashaw is elected President and CEO in July. He becomes the 7th chief executive in Spangler's 105-year history. Ted Spangler, son of founder Arthur Spangler, and past director of sales, president, chief executive, and board chairman for Spangler Candy Company, dies at 92 in September. Dum Dums become #1 lollipop in late 2011 per IRI scan data.
2014: William G. Martin is appointed President and CFO and is the first person outside the family to serve as President. Kirkland B. Vashaw remains CEO.
2018: On May 23, The Spangler Candy Company made the winning bid of $18.83 million in a bankruptcy auction for the New England Confectionery Company, and then refused to close without a price reduction, so Necco went to the next highest bidder.  However, on September 21, 2018, it was confirmed that Spangler had acquired Necco from a private party, retaining its line of Necco Wafers, Sweethearts, and Canada Mints, while unloading or discontinuing Necco's other brands.  Production of Necco Wafers resumed in May 2020, while Sweethearts will relaunch prior to Valentine's Day 2020.  In addition, the company purchased significant property adjacent to its Bryan, Ohio campus for future expansion.
2020: Bit-O-Honey brand is acquired from Pearson's Candy Company.

References

External links
Spangler Candy Official site
Spangler Candy Official Online Candy store
Dum Dum Pops Official site
Saf-T-Pops Official site

Companies based in Bryan, Ohio
Confectionery companies of the United States
Food manufacturers of the United States
Privately held companies based in Ohio
Williams County, Ohio
Food and drink companies established in 1906
American companies established in 1906
1906 establishments in Ohio